Ranunculus propinquus is a species of flowering plant belonging to the family Ranunculaceae.

Its native range is Eastern European Russia to Russian Far East and China.

Synonyms:
 Ranunculus japonicus var. propinquus (C.A.Mey.) W.T.Wang
 Ranunculus lanuginosiformis Selin ex J.Fellm.
 Ranunculus subborealis 

Subspecies:
 Ranunculus propinquus subsp. subborealis (Tzvelev) Kuvaev (synonym: Ranunculus subborealis Tzvelev)

References

propinquus